State Route 222 (SR 222), named Talmage Road along its entire length, is an unsigned state highway in the U.S. state of California. It was originally constructed as a short spur route of U.S. Route 101 in Mendocino County to what was the Mendocino State Hospital in Talmage. The road has remained a state highway after the hospital closed down and the City of Ten Thousand Buddhas monastery was established on the former site in 1976. The SR 222 designation legislatively ends at its intersection with East Side Road, where the road continues as Bodhi Way into the monastery complex.

Route description
Built originally to provide access to the long-defunct Mendocino State Hospital, it is an unsigned spur route off of U.S. Route 101 at Ukiah, ending east at the intersection with East Side Road in Talmage, outside the City of Ten Thousand Buddhas monastery & university (which is located on the grounds of the former Mendocino State Hospital). West of U.S. Route 101, Talmage Road continues as a city street under Ukiah's control.

SR 222 is not part of the National Highway System, a network of highways that are considered essential to the country's economy, defense, and mobility by the Federal Highway Administration.

Major intersections

See also

References

External links

California @ AARoads.com - State Route 222
Caltrans: Route 222 highway conditions
California Highways: SR 222

222
State Route 222
Ukiah, California